The Emblem of Goa is the official emblem of the Government of Goa, a state of India.

Design

The emblem depicts a "Vriksha Deep", a type of diya lamp, at its centre. The lamp represents enlightenment through knowledge and is surrounded by a stylised design of coconut leaves which represent the bountiful and beautiful aspects of Goa. A Sanskrit motto appears above the lamp and can be translated as "may everyone see goodness, may none suffer any pain" (Devnagari: सर्वे भद्राणि पश्यन्तु मा कश्चिद् दुःखमाप्नुयात्; Sarve bhadrāṇi paśyantu mā kaścid duḥkhamāpnuyāt). The crest is formed by the National Emblem of India, the Lions of Sarnath, and the arms are supported by two open hands.

History

Portuguese India
Goa was administered by Portugal from 1510 until 1961 when it was annexed by India.

Goa, Daman and Diu
Between 1961 and 1987, Goa was part of the union territory of Goa, Daman and Diu

Government banner
The Government of Goa can be represented by a banner displaying the emblem of the state on a white field.

See also
 National Emblem of India
 List of Indian state emblems

References

External links
 Article by the Government of Goa, Department of Information

National symbols of India
Goa
Goa
Goa